U-77891 is an opioid analgesic drug that was first synthesized in 1983 by the Upjohn company. It was originally synthesized to prove that the removal of a single methylene spacer of the benzamide would alter a κ-opioid receptor agonist such as U-50488 into an μ-opioid receptor agonist, as well as producing a semi-rigid derivative of U-47700. This would help elucidate the relative positions of the hydrogen-bond acceptors and substituted aromatic system to find the compound with the lowest Ki value in a series of benzamide opioids dating back to the 1970s. The original work found a mixture of agonists and antagonists.

U-77891 acts as an agonist of the μ-opioid, δ-opioid and κ-opioid receptors with Ki values of 2, 105 and 2300 nM, respectively. The compound has ED50 values of 0.02 mg/kg and 0.21 mg/kg in mouse phenylquinone writhing and tail-flick assays. One reason for the high potency is the LogP of 4.57, allowing it to accumulate in fatty tissue such as the brain.

See also 
 AH-7921
 U-47700
 U-50488
 U-69,593

References 

Benzamides
Bromoarenes
Synthetic opioids
Mu-opioid receptor agonists